George Robbins Gliddon (1809 – November 16, 1857) was an English-born American Egyptologist.

Biography

He was born in Devonshire, England. His father, a merchant, was United States consul at Alexandria where Gliddon was taken at an early age. He had a younger brother, William Alfred Gliddon (b.1819, Cairo) who worked for a short time in Borneo and supplied some skulls from there.

Gliddon became United States vice-consul and took a great interest in Egyptian antiquities. Subsequently, he lectured in the United States and succeeded in attracting attention to the subject of Egyptology. His chief work was Ancient Egypt (1850, ed. 1853). He wrote also Memoir on the Cotton of Egypt (1841); Appeal to the Antiquaries of Europe on the Destruction of the Monuments of Egypt (1841); Discourses on Egyptian Archaeology (1849); Types of Mankind (1854), in conjunction with J. C. Nott; and Indigenous Races of the Earth (1857), also in conjunction with Nott and others.

Gliddon was influenced by Samuel George Morton's craniometry and polygenist theory of human origins. Morton collected hundreds of human skulls from around the world and tried to classify them. Morton claimed that he could judge the intellectual capacity of a race by the cranial capacity (the measure of the volume of the interior of the skull). In Morton's theory, a large skull meant a large brain and high intellectual capacity, and a small skull indicated a small brain and decreased intellectual capacity. By studying these skulls he claimed that the evidence supported polygenism, that each race had a separate origin. Morton had many skulls from Ancient Egypt, and concluded that the ancient Egyptians were not African, but were instead Caucasians.

Morton's followers, particularly Gliddon and Josiah Nott in their monumental tribute to Morton's work, Types of Mankind (1854), carried Morton's ideas further and backed up Morton's findings which supported the notion of polygenism, which contends that humanity originates from different lineages and is the ancestor of the multiregional hypothesis.

Gliddon collaborated with Morton on several published works; they shared many views on human races. Morton had sent Gliddon over 100 Egyptian crania specimens. Gliddon was a popular lecturer and researcher on Egyptology and from his studies of ancient Egyptian monuments and hieroglyphics, he concluded that the Egyptians had been white, and that even in the ancient world there had been distinctly different races. He posited that Whites and Negroes had never changed their racial appearance and features. He believed that neither environment or climate could change a race into another. He rejected Monogenesis, and claimed that the Bible supported Polygenisis. Gliddon believed the differences of the races had been impressed upon them by the Creator himself since the beginning.

George Robbins Gliddon died of Yellow Fever on November 16, 1857, in Panama. He was buried in Panama but later re-interred in Philadelphia at Laurel Hill Cemetery at the instigation of his friend, archaeologist  E. G. Squier.

Bibliography
 Types of Mankind preserved at the Internet Archive
 Indigenous Races of the Earth preserved at the Internet Archive

See also
Scientific racism
Craniometry

References

1809 births
1857 deaths
American Christian creationists
American Egyptologists
American expatriates in Egypt
British emigrants to the United States
Burials at Laurel Hill Cemetery (Philadelphia)
Race and intelligence controversy
Proponents of scientific racism